Al-Tarthur is a sub-district located in Maswarah District, Al Bayda Governorate, Yemen.  Al-Tarthur had a population of 358 according to the 2004 census.

References 

Sub-districts in Maswarah District